The Mountrail County Courthouse in Stanley, North Dakota was built in 1914 and served Mountrail County as its courthouse continuously since then.  It was designed by architects Buechner & Orth in what can be termed Academic Revival architecture and/or Late 19th and 20th Century Revivals architecture.  It was listed on the National Register of Historic Places in 1978;  a  area was included in the listing.

References

Government buildings completed in 1914
Courthouses on the National Register of Historic Places in North Dakota
County courthouses in North Dakota
National Register of Historic Places in Mountrail County, North Dakota
1914 establishments in North Dakota
Revival architecture in the United States